Taşucu Atatürk Museum is a house museum in Turkey.

Atatürk (1881–1938), the founder of modern Turkey was fond of Taşucu and visited the town four times: 28 January 1925, 12 May 1926, 11 February 1931, and 20 February 1935. During these visits, he likened Taşucu to  Thessaloniki, Greece in which he spent his childhood. In 2000s Taşucu municipality decided to build a replica of his house in Thessaloniki as a memorial house. Thus, this house, unlike most other Atatürk memorial houses in Turkey, is not a house in which Atatürk actually stayed.

The building was opened to visits on 12 May  2005 after a ceremony in which Rauf Denktaş the leader of Turkish Cypriots attended.

On the ground floor, Atatürk's life in chronological order is exhibited by panels. In the upper floor, there are three rooms; a kitchen, a library, and a guest room with prayer facility. On the uppermost floor there are two rooms; a room of Zübeyde Hanım (Atatürk's mother) and the workroom of Atatürk. The bathroom and the balcony are also on this floor.

See also
Atatürk Museums in Turkey

References

Museums in Turkey
Buildings and structures in Mersin Province
Atatürk museums
Silifke District
Museums established in 2005
2005 establishments in Turkey
Mersin Province